Amanda Cockrell (born 1948)  is a professor of English at Hollins University, specializing in children's literature and creative writing. She is the author of a number of historical novels for adults, some written under her own name and some under the pseudonym Damion Hunter. She has written novels about the Romans and about the indigenous peoples of the Americas. Her first young adult novel, What We Keep Is Not Always What Will Stay, was published in 2011 and was named one of the best children's books of the year by The Boston Globe.

Selected bibliography

As Amanda Cockrell
Legions of the Mist, 1979
Pomegranate Seed, 2002
What We Keep Is Not Always What Will Stay, 2011
The Deer Dancers
Daughter of the Sky, 1995
Wind Caller's Children, 1996
The Long Walk, 1996
The Horse Catchers
When the Horses Came, 1999
Children of the Horse, 2000
The Rain Child,  2001

As Amanda Cockrell "writing as Damion Hunter"
The Wall at the Edge of the World, 2020
(sequel to Legions of the Mist)

As Damion Hunter
The Centurions Trilogy
The Centurions, 1981
Barbarian Princess, 1982
The Emperor's Games, 1984

References

External links

Living people
1948 births
20th-century American novelists
21st-century American novelists
American historical novelists
American women novelists
American writers of young adult literature
Hollins University faculty
Novelists from Virginia
Women historical novelists
Women writers of young adult literature
20th-century American women writers
American women academics
21st-century American women writers